Linda Kuk is a Hong Kong film producer.

Career 
Kuk began her film career as a Production Manager and a Film Coordinator. In 1986, Kuk became a film producer. The first film Kuk produced was My Family, a 1986 comedy film directed by Raymond Fung.

Filmography

Films 
 1985 The Family 
 1986 Devoted to You - Producer
 1986 My Family - Producer 
 1986 Legacy of Rage - Producer
 1987 An Autumn's Tale - Executive producer
 1987 Brotherhood - Producer.
 1987 Magnificent Warriors - Producer.
 1987 It's a Mad, Mad, Mad World - Producer.
 1987 Porky's Meatballs - Producer 
 1987 You OK, I'm OK! - Producer
 1988 It's a Mad, Mad, Mad World II
 1988 Bless this House - Producer.
 1988 Carry on Hotel - Producer.
 1991 Once a Thief- Producer.
 1992 Hard Boiled - Producer
 1992 Now You See Love, Now You Don't - Producer
 1994 Treasure Hunt - Producer
 1996 Somebody Up There Likes Me - Executive producer

See also 
 Terence Chang
 John Shum

References

External links 
 Linda Kuk at allmovie.com
 Linda Kuk at bfi.org
 Linda Kuk Mei Lai at hkcinemagic.com
 Linda Kuk Mei Lai at hkmdb.com
 Linda Kuk at imdb.com
 Linda Kuk at tcm.com
 Linda Kuk at rottentomatoes.com

Chinese women film producers
Hong Kong film producers
Living people
Year of birth missing (living people)